The 1962 Western Australian state election was held on 31 March 1962.

Retiring Members

Labor

 Emil Nulsen (MLA) (Eyre)

LCL

 James Mann (MLA) (Avon Valley)

Country

 Arthur Watts (MLA) (Stirling)

Legislative Assembly
Sitting members are shown in bold text. Successful candidates are highlighted in the relevant colour. Where there is possible confusion, an asterisk (*) is also used.

See also
 Members of the Western Australian Legislative Assembly, 1959–1962
 Members of the Western Australian Legislative Assembly, 1962–1965
 1962 Western Australian Legislative Council election
 1962 Western Australian state election

References
 

Candidates for Western Australian state elections